The Fudge Family may refer to two works by the Irish-born writer Thomas Moore.

 The Fudge Family in Paris (1818)
 The Fudge Family in England (1835)